Oakfield High School and College is a special school based in Hindley, Wigan. The most recent Ofsted inspection rated the school as "Outstanding".

The school opened in September 2006 following the amalgamation of five special schools in the borough. The school philosophy is based on their motto "Learning today for our tomorrow".

Oakfield High School and College and Landgate School, Bryn are federated through The Aspire Federation.

References

External links
Oakfield High School and College official website

Special secondary schools in England
Community schools in the Metropolitan Borough of Wigan
Special schools in the Metropolitan Borough of Wigan
Educational institutions established in 2006
2006 establishments in England